Saint Mary's University of Minnesota, (SMUMN) is a private Catholic university with an undergraduate residential college in Winona, Minnesota; graduate and professional programs in Winona, the Twin Cities, and Rochester; and various course delivery sites around Minnesota and Wisconsin as well as Jamaica. The institution was founded in 1912 and is associated with the Institute of the Brothers of the Christian Schools, also known as the De La Salle Brothers.

History
Bishop Patrick Richard Heffron founded Saint Mary's College in 1912, a men's college operated by the Winona Diocese. Heffron Hall, a residential hall was built in 1920, and named after Bishop Heffron. By 1925 it became a four-year liberal arts college. In 1933, it was taken over by the De La Salle Christian Brothers, a religious order whose main charism is teaching. It became a co-educational university in 1969 and later purchased the campus and buildings of the former College of Saint Teresa, a women's college in Winona that ceased operations in 1989. In recent years, portions of the Saint Teresa campus were sold to Winona State University and Winona Cotter High School.

During the 1980s the main Winona campus underwent vigorous growth. Constructed during this decade were the Ice Arena (1986), Performance Center, including Figliulo Recital Hall and Joseph Page Theatre (1987), Brother Charles Hall science addition (1987), Gilmore Creek Residence (1989), and Christian Brothers Residence (1989). More recent additions include McEnery Center (1993), Gostomski Fieldhouse and Jul Gernes Pool (1994), pedestrian plaza (1994), Pines Hall residence (1995), Hendrickson Center (1996), The Heights (1997), Oscar and Mary Jane Straub Clocktower and Court (1999), Hillside Hall residence (2001), ice arena addition (2004) a soccer field / track complex in 2008, Brother Leopold Hall (2012, which includes an outdoor recreation center donated by the Winona ski club), and the new freshmen residence hall Brother William completed in 2019. During the summer of 2021, the old Adducci science building was renovated and renamed Aquinas Hall, which includes a brand new facility for the University's nursing program.

Beginning in 1985, then-president Brother Louis DeThomasis launched a series of new, non-traditional graduate and professional programs. The Schools of Graduate and Professional Programs, using a variety of course delivery methods and locations, is now one of Minnesota's largest graduate schools. SGPP programs are delivered at the Twin Cities campus, Rochester center, Apple Valley center, Minnetonka center, Oakdale center, and at locations around Minnesota and Wisconsin. The university has a partnership with Catholic College of Mandeville, Jamaica. In 2011, the Twin Cities campus added Harrington Mansion and Saint Mary's Event Center to its expanding facilities on Park Avenue in Minneapolis.

In 1995, Saint Mary's College was renamed Saint Mary's University of Minnesota to reflect the expanded role of graduate and professional programming, and to distinguish Saint Mary's from schools with similar names.

Presidents

Academics
Saint Mary's University offers a wide range of degrees. The university offers bachelor's, master's, and doctorate degrees for both traditional and non-traditional students. In addition to the degrees, Saint Mary's also offers teaching licensures, certifications, and pre-professional programs. Both undergraduate and graduate programs offer online learning. Men study for the priesthood at the adjacent Immaculate Heart of Mary Seminary, owned and operated by the Diocese of Winona.

Changes in 2022 

Due to financial difficulties and low undergraduate enrollment, in May 2022, the University announced plans to phase out 11 majors including, English, history, theatre, music, art, and theology. The president of the university, Father James P. Burns, said about the decision, "...In particular, what we looked at is the majors that we are phasing out are those that really were low enrolled and also didn't hold great promise in terms of what many families and students want, which is marketable skills and jobs after college."

Athletics
The university's sports teams are nicknamed the Cardinals (previously the Redmen until 1988) and compete as a member of the Minnesota Intercollegiate Athletic Conference (MIAC). There are 21 NCAA Division III varsity sports teams at Saint Mary's. The Saint Mary's fastpitch softball team won the 2000 NCAA Division III National Title. That title was the university's first and so far only national team title. In 1955, the college administration elected to discontinue football as a sport at the university. A task force was formed in 2005 to study the feasibility of adding football, but the proposal was rejected in 2006 by a unanimous vote of the board of trustees.

There is an on-campus cross country ski and running trail in the bluffs and valleys of the 450-acre campus. Athletic facilities are being renovated and expanded. Upgrades were recently made to basketball, baseball and softball. A challenging disc golf course was installed in the bluffs and valleys around campus in 2007. A state-of-the-art outdoor track and soccer complex, and a high-and-low ropes course, were added in 2008. Snowmaking equipment for the trails was recently donated by the Winona ski club.

Saint Mary's has long had a friendly crosstown rivalry in non-conference athletics with NCAA Division II member Winona State University, which is the regional public university that is part of the Minnesota State Colleges and Universities system.

Notable alumni

Anthony Adducci, pioneer of the medical device industry in Minnesota; is best known for co-founding Guidant, the company that manufactured the world's first lithium battery powered artificial pacemaker
Michael Anthony Bilandic, former mayor of Chicago and chief justice of the Illinois Supreme Court
Frank Billock, NFL player
Bernard Carey, politician who served as Cook County state's attorney and a judge on the Circuit Court of Cook County
Fritz Cronin, NFL player
Sean Duffy, former congressman from Wisconsin's 7th congressional district
 Mike Johanns, former secretary of agriculture of the United States, former governor of Nebraska, former United States senator
Mike Leaf, college basketball coach
John McDonough, hockey executive
James Miller, member of the Brothers of the Christian Schools and murder victim
Bob Warner, Canadian ice hockey forward
Jerome J. Workman, Jr., prolific author and editor of scientific reference works on the subject of spectroscopy
Tom Younghans, NHL player

See also

Lasallian Educational Institutions
Immaculate Heart of Mary Seminary
 List of colleges and universities in Minnesota
 Higher education in Minnesota

References

External links
 Official website

 
Lasallian colleges and universities
Educational institutions established in 1912
Education in Winona County, Minnesota
Buildings and structures in Winona, Minnesota
Tourist attractions in Winona County, Minnesota
Catholic universities and colleges in Minnesota
Association of Catholic Colleges and Universities
1912 establishments in Minnesota